Olaf is a fictional character from Disney's Frozen franchise, produced by Walt Disney Animation Studios. Olaf is first presented in the 53rd animated film Frozen (2013) as an inanimate snowman created by Elsa and Anna in their childhood. He then reappears as a  character in the film as Anna searches for her runaway sister in hopes of restoring summer. Olaf is recreated by Elsa as she accidentally plunges Arendelle into an eternal winter. Olaf helps Anna and Kristoff find Elsa and journeys with them all the way back to the kingdom, where he remains part of the sisters' lives and appears again in the 2019 film, Frozen II. He is voiced by Josh Gad.

Development

Origins and concept
The Disney studio made their first attempts to adapt Hans Christian Andersen's fairytale, "The Snow Queen", as early as 1943, when Walt Disney considered the possibility of producing a biography film of the author. However, the story and the characters proved to be too symbolic and posed unsolvable problems to Disney and his animators. Later on, other Disney executives had made efforts to translate this material to the big screen, however these proposals were all shelved due to similar issues.

In 2008, Chris Buck pitched Disney his version of the story called Anna and the Snow Queen, which was planned to be traditionally animated. This version was "completely different" from Frozen; it had a storyline that stuck much closer to the original material and featured an entirely different Olaf character, the role more resembling Marshmallow's. However, by early 2010, the project was scrapped again. On December 22, 2011, Disney announced a new title for the film, Frozen, which would be released on November 27, 2013, and a different crew from the previous attempt. The new script, which employed "the same concept but was completely rewritten", finally solved the long-term problem with Andersen's story by depicting Anna and Elsa as sisters.

Voice
Josh Gad, a Tony-nominated actor best known for his performance as Elder Cunningham in Broadway's The Book of Mormon (which was co-written by the Frozen's co-songwriter Robert Lopez), was cast to voice Olaf. Gad later expressed that getting a part in a Disney film was "kind of a dream come true" for him, as he had always been a fan of Disney films in general and their animated productions in particular. "I grew up during the second golden age of Disney animation, when every movie that came out was an event – The Little Mermaid, Beauty and the Beast, Aladdin, The Lion King," he said. Impressed by the performances of comedic relief sidekicks such as Timon and Pumbaa in The Lion King, or the Genie in Aladdin, Gad set the goal to play characters of this type since his early age: "I remember [...] saying, "I want to do that one day. I really want to do that,"" he recalled. Gad based his performance on his The Book of Mormon co-star Rory O'Malley.

Design and characterization
As a snowman Anna and Elsa built together as kids, Olaf represents innocent love and the joy the sisters once had when they were young before being split. He is not just funny, he also has a "big role to play representing the innocent love in the scale of fear versus love." It was not until he meant something to the girls that he resonated with us," "Olaf couldn't just be thrown in, he had to have a purpose" and that one of his purposes was to be the embodiment of the sisterly relationship that had gone cold. "When Anna and Elsa were very little, and before Elsa's powers accidentally hurt Anna, they played. They'd sneak away and play with her powers. And you see them roll the snowman. He's not magical. He doesn't come to life. But they name him Olaf and he likes warm hugs." "It inspires the look. And so when Elsa is singing "Let It Go" obviously the first thing she goes to is the last moment she was happy. And it was that moment. And so he's imbued with that. He's innocent love." The continuous themes that can be seen throughout the movie revolve around the power of love and fear. Olaf, on one end of that spectrum, represents the most innocent kind form of love. It is possible that he resembles some of the characteristics of Anna's younger self. This provides a connection between the sisters' happy past and their ability to remember that love in difficult times. Overall his character provides much of the comic relief found in the film, while conveying lovable innocence and purity. "And so he was just a lot of fun, and emotionally he'll bring a lot that we weren't able to show you yet, too. So he's funny in the kids-state-the-obvious kind of way." (Lee) "And he can say very poignant things too." (Buck)

In very early versions of the film, Olaf was originally written as one of the guards at Elsa's castle when the concept of Elsa controlling a legion of menacing snowmen was still in the story. Buck talked on this scrapped character setting, "We always talked about she was trying to learn about her powers. So we talked about it like it's the first pancake. You know that pancakes get burned on the bottom that you throw out. Well, that's Olaf. Olaf was her first pancake." In order to keep the character from getting too complex, the directors wanted him to have a childlike innocence. According to Lee, "When you're a child the awkwardness and the funny shapes you make with the snowmen, the heads are never perfect" and that's how they came up with the ideas when thinking what kids would think of a snowman.

Gad also made plenty of improvements for Olaf during the recording sessions. But the directors were very careful not to risk the character taking over the story. "Olaf was very much a sketch until we had Josh Gad, and then we would just get in the room and play and we'd have a lot of fun and that's really how we found his voice specifically and how he looks at the world. It really was working with Josh that did that." "It was a lot funnier than I expected, thanks largely to Josh Gad's surprisingly well-written deluded snowman character" (Del Vecho). Gad's studio performance was videotaped, and animators used his facial expressions and physical moves as a reference for animating the character.

Hyrum Osmond, one of the film's animation supervisors, served as the character lead for Olaf. Del Vecho described him as "quiet but he has a funny, wacky personality so we knew he'd bring a lot of comedy to it." Osmond himself admitted that "My personality's a bit like Olaf."

The filmmakers developed a new software called Spaces to aid artists in deconstructing Olaf and rebuilding him as part of the animation process. "It was kind of an animator's dream," Osmond enthused. "You have a character that can come apart. We said to the animation crew, 'Just have fun with it.'" "The fun part of Olaf, we learned early on that his body parts can fall apart and we knew that we would want to take full advantage of that. You will see quite a bit more of that in the movie in a surprising way." (Chris Buck). "Olaf has become his own sort of standout comic character and the animators are having fun animating him. There's a lot of squash in there – I mean, a lot – and he's the only character we can throw off a cliff and have him come apart on the way down, still survive and be happy. We have the contrast of Olaf being a Snowman but loving the idea of Summer" (Del Vecho)

Appearances

Frozen
His first appearance in Frozen is during Anna and Elsa's childhood as a snowman. Later, Olaf is recreated  during the first chorus of "Let It Go", and unknown to Elsa, comes to life. Two days later, Anna and Kristoff and Sven cross paths with Olaf while traveling through a meadow. Anna's first instinct is to give Olaf the carrot nose that he had been missing. Before they continue on their way, Olaf sings a short number fantasizing about what it might be like to experience summer heat,  unaware that he'll melt. Olaf then guides Anna and Kristoff to Elsa's ice palace.

After they are expelled by Marshmallow, Olaf accompanies Anna and Kristoff to the trolls who raised Kristoff, seeking help from Grand Pabbie in regards to ice that is in Anna's heart. There, the trolls try to marry Anna and Kristoff ("Fixer Upper") and Olaf sings a sentence in the sequence.

The group thinks a "True Love's Kiss" can save Anna, and so head back to Arendelle. Olaf gets separated from the group on the way, and only appears again in the library after Hans' betrayal, having managed to sneak past the guards. Olaf comforts Anna, telling her the real meaning of love. Then they head out to the fjord to find Kristoff, but Olaf is blown away.

In the end, when Elsa finally dissipates the eternal winter and reestablishes herself as queen, she creates him a snow cloud to stand directly above him so he could fulfill his dream of living in summer without melting. He then smells a flower and sneezes his carrot nose directly into Sven's mouth, but Sven returns it to him. He is last seen skating with Anna and Elsa as Elsa creates an improvised skating rink on the castle courtyard.

Frozen Fever
Olaf appears in the short film Frozen Fever where he is caught stuffing a piece of cake into his mouth by Elsa. When Elsa is not paying any attention, Olaf quickly spits it back onto the cake where he ate from. Then, he is found helping Kristoff and Sven trying to get rid of the snowgies that are being produced every time Elsa sneezes. At the end of the special, he is seen helping Kristoff and Sven escort the snowgies to live with Marshmallow at the ice palace on the North Mountain.

Sofia the First
Olaf made an appearance in an episode of Sofia the First titled "The Secret Library: Olaf and the Tale of Miss Nettle", the second episode of a four-part story arc, which premiered February 15, 2016 on Disney Channel and Disney Junior. He is once again voiced by Josh Gad.

Olaf's Frozen Adventure

Olaf starred in a 21-minute Frozen holiday film along with Anna, Elsa, Kristoff, and Sven, which debuted in theaters for a limited time engagement with Disney·Pixar's Coco on November 22, 2017. It made its television debut on ABC on December 14, 2017.

When Christmas arrives in Arendelle, Anna and Elsa plan a surprise party for their subjects. Olaf is particularly excited to start the festivities, but when it comes time for the party to begin, all the guests leave after the annual ringing of the Yule bell in the castle courtyard. Anna and Elsa come to realize that their isolation had robbed them of any holiday traditions of their own, which Elsa feels guilty for. Olaf, however, enlists Sven to journey throughout Arendelle and learn from the populace of all the traditions the season has to offer. Once enough information is gathered (including melting and then reforming in Oaken's sauna), Olaf makes his way back to the castle, though a mishap with overloading Kristoff's sled separates the two, and destroys the sled and all the holiday-related keepsakes in the process. With only a fruitcake, Olaf journeys into the woods, and is attacked by vicious wolves while traversing through. He narrowly escapes them, but loses the fruitcake shortly thereafter to a hawk.

Depressed at having failed Anna and Elsa, Olaf wanders into the night, depressed, and figures it would be best to remain lost. Meanwhile, Sven informs Kristoff, Anna, and Elsa of Olaf's encounter with the wolves, and a search party is organized to find the missing snowman. After much searching, the royal sisters come across the downhearted Olaf, who apologizes for failing in his mission. Anna and Elsa reveal that they managed to find a tradition on their own: Olaf. It is revealed that during the years that they were separated, Anna would create drawings of Olaf (and on one occasion, a doll), and slide them under Elsa's door each Christmas as a reminder of their childhood and the love they have for each other. The sisters then lead Olaf and their subjects onto a frozen lake beneath the northern lights to host a holiday party and create a giant Christmas tree made of ice.

Frozen II
Olaf is featured in the sequel to Frozen, Frozen II; released on November 22, 2019, in the US. In this film, it is revealed that Olaf no longer needs his personal flurry and now has a layer of permafrost that keeps him from melting. While running from Arendelle, Olaf starts to blow but Kristoff saves him from being blown away he was seen playing with the children as they were decorating some ice crystals.

When Elsa gets frozen knowing the truth about the past, Olaf disintegrates once Elsa's power is gone. After Anna has the dam destroyed, and Elsa is saved by her action, Elsa rebuilds Olaf.

Once Upon a Snowman

Once Upon a Snowman tells Olaf's story after he is created by Elsa and before he meets Anna and Kristoff. It explains why Olaf likes summer and how he remembers his name.

Olaf Presents

Inspired by a scene in Frozen II in which Olaf recaps the entirety of the first film in 90 seconds, Olaf Presents has Olaf recapping several popular Disney films in that same vein. He recaps The Little Mermaid, Aladdin, The Lion King, Tangled, and Moana.

Theme parks
At Disneyland, there was a talking audio-animatronic Olaf sitting on top the roof of the cottage that was home to the Anna and Elsa meet-and-greet. From July 5 to September 1, 2014, as part of 'Frozen' Summer Fun show at Disney's Hollywood Studios, Olaf will appear in Olaf on Summer Vacation section to chime in and keep visitors updated on all his adventures. He is also available for pick-ups and take-along in various locations in the park. The character will also appear in "Frozen" Fireworks Spectacular section alongside Anna, Elsa and Kristoff, a fireworks display set to the music of Frozen. Anna, Elsa, Kristoff, and Olaf will make appearances in Mickey’s Once Upon a Christmastime Parade, offered during Mickey’s Very Merry Christmas Party at Magic Kingdom in November and December 2014 (from November 7 to December 31). Officially starting January 7, 2015, Olaf began making meet and greet appearances in Disney California Adventure at "Olaf's Snow Fest", and guests could learn how to draw either Olaf or Marshmallow at the Disney Animation Building's Animation Academy as part of the park's "Frozen Fun" event.

Beginning May 22, 2015, Disneyland debuted a new nighttime parade called "Paint the Night", which includes a Frozen float featuring Anna, Elsa, and Olaf, as part of the park's 60th anniversary celebration. Olaf appears as audio-animatronics in the dark ride Frozen Ever After, which opened in Epcot on June 21, 2016. He first appears alongside Sven, inviting guests to Elsa's ice palace to the tune of "Do You Want to Build a Snowman?". He is later seen ice-skating in her castle while singing "For the First Time in Forever" and appears at the end alongside Elsa and Anna to perform "In Summer".

Other

He also makes an appearance in the Sky Adventures television advertisement.
A balloon of the character debuted in the 91st Macy's Thanksgiving Day Parade in 2017.
Olaf is a non-playable character in Kingdom Hearts III.

References

External links

Official character page

Disney's Frozen characters
Film characters introduced in 2013
Film sidekicks
Fictional snowmen
Male characters in animated films
Animated characters introduced in 2013